An opera hat also called a chapeau claque or gibus is a top hat variant that is collapsible through a spring system, originally intended for less spacious venues, such as the theatre and opera house.

Typically made of black satin, it folds vertically through a push or a snap on the top of the hat for convenient storage in a wardrobe or under the seat. It opens with an easy push from underneath.

Name
Its French name "chapeau claque" is a composition of chapeau, which means hat, and claque, which means "tap" or "click". The "chapeau claque" is thus a hat that folds with a click, and unfolds likewise.

In English, the hat model is usually referred to as a collapsible top-hat, gibus or more often opera hat.

History

The construction may originally have been inspired by a historical hat model called "chapeau bras" ("arm hat"), made as bicorne or tricorne to be carried folded under the arm

On May 5, 1812, London hatter Thomas Francis Dollman patented a design for "an elastic round hat" supported by ribs and springs. His patent was described as:

Some sources have taken this to describe an early folding top hat, although it is not explicitly stated whether Dollman's design was specifically for male or female headgear. Dollman's patent expired in 1825. Operating from Poissy, Paris, France, around 1840, Antoine Gibus's design for a spring-loaded collapsible top-hat proved so popular that hats made to it became known as gibus.  They were also often called opera hats due to the common practice of storing them in their flattened state under one's seat at the opera, though the term can also refer to any tall formal men's hat. The characteristic snapping sound heard upon opening a gibus suggested a third name, the chapeau claque, "claque" being the French word for "slap".

Gallery

In popular culture

In the nursery rhyme adapted from the sixteenth-century ballad, A Frog He Would A Wooing Go, the titular frog sets off to woo "with his opera hat." During an attack by a cat and her kittens, the frog escapes but "picks up his hat" before leaving. 

A chapeau claque is an inherent element of the stage image of Krzysztof Grabowski - the leader of Polish punk-rock band Pidżama Porno.

In the Russian children's books and subsequent animated features about Gena the Crocodile, the main villain is an elderly lady named Shapoklyak, the Russified form of chapeau claque. She also wears one.

In the first-person shooter video game Team Fortress 2, one of the most common hats equippable by the players is called the Ghostly Gibus, one of the few hats in the game that can be obtained without spending any money. Other variants of this hat are the Ghastly Gibus, the Ghastlier Gibus, and the Ghastlierest Gibus.

See also
opera cloak
opera gloves
opera glasses

References

External links

 Les Gibus une famille de chapelier (in French)

Hats
Formal wear